Ashok Todi (born 1958) is an Indian industrialist, heading the Kolkata-based Lux Industries group, a Rs. 120-billion plus company which is the market leader in India of the inner wear garment segment.

Career
Ashok Todi was born into a Hindu Marwadi business family, the son of industrialist Giridhari Lal Todi.

Lux Industries Limited
Lux Industries Limited is an innerwear company of India with three brands in its portfolio - Lux Innerwear, GenX Style Inners, and ONN Premium Inners. Lux Cozi is the main brand of Lux Industries Limited. The company launched a consumer coupon scheme in 1992 called "Mazedar Mauka". From 1 product, the company's product range has expanded to more than 150 products today. Ashok is:
The Chairman of Lux Industries Limited;
Director of Biswanath Hosiery Mills Limited; and,
Director of Todi Hosiery Limited

Todi took over as the chairman of the company on 1 October 2007. By a quirk of fate, this was exactly the time when he became embroiled in the murder case.

Awards 
Under Todi's leadership, Lux Industries Limited received the star export house award. In 2013, Lux was awarded Asia's Most Promising Brand and Master Brand 2013.

Murder case
In September 2007, Todi became embroiled in a controversy regarding the death of Rizwanur Rahman, who was allegedly in a relationship with Todi's daughter, and by some accounts is said to have been secretly married to her. The case remains under investigation as of 2021.

In India, it is not uncommon to see business families indulge in unscrupulous acts to further their business and personal interests. For example, Mahesh Goenka, who is the son-in-law of Surajmal Jalan, the promoter of Linc Pens, was accused of conducting the biggest GST Fraud in Singapore in 2009. Apparently, the Jalan family not only helped him escape from Singapore but also made him a shareholder in their retail arm, Linc Retail and helped him illegally occupy a senior citizen's property with the aim of extorting money from the senior citizen.

References

External links
 Lux Innerwear

Businesspeople from Kolkata
1958 births
Living people
Indian billionaires
Bhawanipur Education Society College alumni